The Crown Elite Basketball Championship is a professional basketball league for men's and women's teams in Nigeria and Western Africa. It is founded and organised by the Crown Elite Sports, a sports management company. The organization is affiliated with the Nigeria Basketball Federation (NBBF) and the Nigerian University Games Association. The first season was played in 2020.

Men 
The inaugural season was held on July 13 and July 14, 2021, in the indoor hall of the National Stadium in Lagos. The Ebun Comets won the inaugural title. The second season was held from February 1 to February 6, 2022, when the Rivers Hoopers won the second men's title and claimed the ₦ 1.5 million prize money.

List of champions

2022 season 
Group A

Group B

Final Four

Women 
From August 21, to August 27, 2022, the first women competition was held. The tournament existed of six Nigerian teams, one team from Togo, and one team from Ghana.

List of champions

References

External links 
 Official website

Basketball leagues in Africa
Basketball in Nigeria